Michael Raymond Mallock (born 26 October 1982) is an English racing driver from Northampton.  He is the son of Ray Mallock and grandson of Arthur Mallock, who were also professional racers. Michael later competed in the GT4 European Cup.

Michael stopped racing full-time in 2011 to take a role within the family business and is now Chief Executive at RML Group. He now occasionally races in historic cars including various historic Mallocks and at other one-off events.

Racing record

Britcar 24 Hour results

References 

Michael Mallock official site
GT4 Cup Official Biography

1982 births
British racing drivers
Living people
FIA GT Championship drivers
Blancpain Endurance Series drivers
24 Hours of Spa drivers
Britcar 24-hour drivers

GT4 European Series drivers